The Avord Tower is a 16-story office tower in Regina, Saskatchewan, Canada. The 16 story building was completed in 1967 and is an example of Modernist architecture. The Avord Tower stands on the site of the old North-West Territories Supreme Court building. From 1967 until 1976 this was the tallest building in Regina.

See also 
 List of tallest buildings in Regina, Saskatchewan

References 

Buildings and structures in Regina, Saskatchewan
Office buildings completed in 1967